The following is a list of awards and nominations received by Spanish actor Antonio Banderas.

Major associations

Academy Awards

Golden Globe Awards

Primetime Emmy Awards

Screen Actors Guild Awards

Tony Awards

Other associations

Association of Latin Entertainment Critics

ALMA Award

Annie Award

Australian Academy of Cinema and Television Arts Awards

Berlin International Film Festival

Blockbuster Entertainment Awards

Cannes Film Festival

Critics' Choice Movie Awards

Drama Desk Award

European Film Awards

Fotogramas de Plata Award

Golden India Catalina Award

Goya Awards

Hollywood Film Awards

Imagen Awards

International Cinephile Society

Los Angeles Film Critics Association

MTV Movie & TV Awards

Murcia Week of Spanish Cinema

NAMIC Vision Award

New York Film Critics Circle

Nickelodeon Kids' Choice Awards

Sant Jordi Awards

Satellite Awards

Saturn Awards

Spanish Actors Union Award

Theatre World Award

Valladolid International Film Festival

Venice International Film Festival

References

External links
 

Banderas, Antonio